Peltz may refer to:
 Dietrich Peltz (1914–2001), German Luftwaffe bomber pilot and general of the Wehrmacht
 John Peltz (1861–1906), American professional baseball player
 Mary Ellis Peltz (1890-1981) American opera critic, and founding editor of Opera News
 Nelson Peltz (born 1942), American businessman
 Nicola Peltz (born 1995), American actress
 Perri Peltz (born 1961), American television journalist
 Peter Peltz (1915–2001), American artist
 Will Peltz (born 1986), American actor

See also 
 Pelts